The Unfortunates is an experimental "book in a box" published in 1969 by English author B. S. Johnson and reissued in 2008 by New Directions. The 27 sections are unbound, with a first and last chapter specified: the 25 sections between them, ranging from a single paragraph to 12 pages in length, are designed to be read in any order, giving a total of 15.5 septillion possible combinations that the story can be read in. Christopher Fowler described it as "a fairly straightforward meditation on death and friendship, told through memories." Jonathan Coe described it as "one of the lost masterpieces of the sixties".

BBC producer Lorna Pegram employed Johnson to talk about this creation for the TV series "Release" after she was lobbied by Carmen Callil of Panther books. With barely any negotiation the interview was ready months before the book was ready for publication. The film included Johnson holding a mock-up of the book that was not at all similar to the final publication.

Johnson said of the book "I did not think then, and do not think now, that this solved the problem completely… But I continue to believe that my solution was nearer; and even if it was only marginally nearer, then it was still a better solution to the problem of conveying the mind’s randomness than the imposed order of a bound book."

Plot 
A sportswriter is sent to a city (identifiable through landmarks as Nottingham) on an assignment, only to find himself confronted by ghosts from his past. As he attempts to report an association football match, memories of his friend, a tragic victim of cancer, haunt his mind.

The city visited remains unnamed, however the novel contains an accurate description of Nottingham landmarks, its streetscape, and its environment in 1969, with additional recallings of 1959.
The football ground in the novel is obviously Nottingham Forest's City Ground, whence the fictional football club 'City' comes.

References

External links 
New Directions Publishing

1969 British novels
English novels
Novels set in Nottinghamshire
Panther Books books
Nottingham